Alfredo Cospito (born 1967) is an Italian anarchist. He was sentenced to 10 years for kneecapping the head of the Italian nuclear power company Ansaldo Nucleare in 2012, and subsequently to life without parole for bombing a Carabinieri barracks. In 2022, Cospito was placed into the 41-bis prison regime, which involves solitary confinement for 22 hours every day. In protest, he began an ongoing hunger strike in October 2022, and there have been demonstrations and attacks in support. In February, the Supreme Court of Cassation rejected the appeal of Cospito's lawyer against his placement in the 41-bis system.

Early life
Cospito was born in Pescara in 1967. He refused to continue military service after being conscripted in his twenties and was convicted of desertion, then pardoned by Francesco Cossiga, President of Italy, after going on hunger strike for one month. In the early 1990s, he was involved in squatting actions in Bologna, Pescara and Lake Maggiore, being arrested for the attempt to make a self-managed social centre in a derelict factory in Pescara. He moved to Turin and met his wife; together they ran a tattoo shop. He is an anarchist.

Kneecapping of Adinolfi

On 7 May 2012, Cospito and his accomplice, Nicola Gai, rode on a motorbike to the house of Roberto Adinolfi, executive of the Italian nuclear power company Ansaldo Nucleare. The pair shot Adinolfi in the leg three times, fracturing his knee, known as 'kneecapping'. A four-page communiqué sent to Corriere della Sera newspaper claiming responsibility for the shooting on behalf of the 'Olga Cell of the FAI/FRI' (tIalian: Federazione Anarchica Informale, FAI), taking its name in solidarity with imprisoned Conspiracy of Fire Nuclei member Olga Ikondomidou, several other attacks have been taken place under the moniker. The shooting and continued threats against the Italian state tax collection agency, Equitalia[it], prompted the Italian then Interior Minister Annamaria Cancellieri to assign 18,000 police officers to security detail following the attack.

In the early hours of the morning of 14 September 2012 Cospito was arrested with Gai in Turin. The pair were linked to the crime via surveillance footage, wiretaps and textual analysis of the communiqué and were found guilty, sentenced to ten years and eight months. Nicola Gai was released in 2020.

Bombing of Carabinieri barracks 

While serving his sentence, Cospito received an additional 20 year term for the 2006 bombing of a Carabinieri cadet barracks near Turin. His partner Anna Beniamino was also convicted, receiving a sentence of 16 and a half years. The bombing was planned with a booby-trap technique, with two explosive devices: a minor one to lure cadets out, and a second one with a much higher potential (500 grams of black powder, along with bolts, screws and stones) timed to explode 15 minutes later, to kill them. The court found that only by chance the two explosions resulted in no casualties.

The Supreme Court of Cassation changed the sentence to "political massacre", upgrading it from 20 years in prison to life without parole because, although no one has been killed in the attack, the bomb could potentially harm people. The FAI declared it was an attack against "the infamous Italian Republic and the equally infamous anniversary of the Carabinieri. We hit the Carabinieri school in Fossano to make them understand from an early age what admiration their criminal military career provokes in us, the exploited."

41-bis and hunger strike 

Cospito was moved into the restrictive 41-bis prison regime in Bancali prison in Sassari by the order of then Minister of Justice Marta Cartabia in May 2022. This regime was created to stop mafia bosses communicating with their outside organizations and was later broadened to include "mafia, criminal, terrorist or subversive associations"; it involves solitary confinement for 22 hours every day, with visits restricted to one hour per month. Access to rehabilitation programs is severely limited, as much as needed to prevent communication with the criminal organisation the inmate belongs to. Cospito commented "In addition to life imprisonment, given that from prison I continued to write and collaborate with the anarchist press, it was decided to shut my mouth forever with 41-bis".

On 20 October 2022, Cospito began a hunger strike against the conditions of the 41-bis regime, losing almost 50 kg by 9 February. More than 200 criminal lawyers and jurists signed a petition condemning the judicial treatment of Cospito. In protest, anarchist groups held demonstrations in Bologna, Turin and Rome. A Greek anarchist group called Revenge Cell Carlo Giuliani bombed a diplomat's car. There have also been attacks on Italian diplomatic offices in Argentina, Bolivia, Germany, Greece, Portugal, Spain and Switzerland. In response, Italian Foreign Minister Antonio Tajani claimed that an international anarchist network was carrying out an "attack against Italy, against Italian institutions", while Interior Minister Matteo Piantedosi repeated the need for the 41-bis regime. Other prisoners began hunger strikes in solidarity with Cospito. Anna Beniamino, incarcerated in Rebibbia Prison in Rome, stopped after 37 days.

A political scandal developed when , coordinator of the ruling Brothers of Italy party, announced in the Chamber of Deputies that Cospito was being manipulated by incarcerated mafia members and criticised members of the Democratic Party for meeting with him. Donzelli had been illegally leaked a video of Cospito in prison by his flatmate  who is the Justice Minister's state secretary. The Democratic Party called for both men to resign and Giorgia Meloni (Prime Minister and leader of the Brothers of Italy) called for calm. The surveillance court in Rome rejected the appeal of Cospito against his prison conditions and Amnesty International made a plea on behalf of the human rights of Cospito. The Supreme Court of Cassation set a date to hear his appeal against the 41-bis regime on 20 April 2023, then brought it forward to 24 February when Cospito's doctor and lawyer argued he would be dead by April. In February, Minister of Justice Carlo Nordio said he refused the appeal of Cospito's lawyer. The Court of Cassation then rejected Cospito's appeal against the imposition of 41-bis. The National Bioethics Committee said it would continue to consider whether Cospito could refuse treatment. After his appeal was rejected, Cospito was returned from the San Paolo hospital to the Opera prison's ICU, where he declared his intention to cease taking dietary supplements. During an announcement by Cospito's lawyers that they were planning an appeal to the European Court of Human Rights, they published a letter from Cospito in which he proclaimed his willingness to die in order to "let the world know what the 41 bis really is", stating in the letter; "I am convinced that my death will be an obstacle to this regime and that the 750 who have been suffering from it for decades will be able to live a life worth living, whatever they have done. I love life, I am a happy man, I wouldn’t trade my life for anyone else’s life. And it is because I love it that I cannot accept this hopeless non-life."

See also 

 Alfredo Bonanno
 Anarchism in Italy
 Anarchist Black Cross
 Insurrectionary anarchism
 Individualist anarchism in Europe
 Prison Abolition

References

1967 births
Living people
Italian anarchists
Hunger strikers
People from Pescara
People from Turin
People convicted on terrorism charges
Insurrectionary anarchists
20th-century squatters

External links

 Writings by Alfredo Cospito at The Anarchist Library